The 5th Parliament of Great Britain was summoned by George I of Great Britain on 17 January 1715 and assembled on the 17 March 1715. When it was dissolved on 10 March 1722 it had been the first Parliament to be held under the Septennial Act of 1716.

The composition of the new House of Commons represented a massive Whig  landslide victory at the election, reversing the pro-Tory landslide of the previous election, with 341 Whigs and 217 Tories. Spencer Compton, 1st Earl of Wilmington, the Whig member for Sussex, was installed as Speaker of the House of Commons.

George I's administration was largely composed of Whigs, being the party which had wholeheartedly supported his accession, and which now enjoyed the full support of the Commons. Viscount Townshend, Secretary of State for the Northern Department and chief ministerial spokesman in the Lords, emerged as the King’s chief minister. The leader of the Whig ministry in the House of Commons was James Stanhope, Secretary of State for the Southern Department. However, during the first session Stanhope was eclipsed by Robert Walpole, the Paymaster-general and brother-in-law of Viscount Townshend. In October 1715 Walpole was promoted to the post of First Lord of the Treasury.

The dominance of Townsend and Walpole caused discontent within the party and by early 1717 both had been forced out of their positions. Townsend was replaced by Lord Sunderland, who was also Lord President of the Council and who in March 1718 became First Lord of the Treasury, effectively consolidating his position to that of a Prime Minister. For the next three years George I's ministry would be led jointly by Lord Sunderland and James Stanhope, with Townshend and Walpole in opposition.

However by 1721, with Sunderland now in the House of Lords, Stanhope dead and the crisis caused by the South Sea Bubble, both Townshend and Walpole had been able to get back into power, Townshend as Secretary of State and Walpole as First Lord of the Treasury in place of Sunderland.

Before the first session closed, the Septennial Act was passed, lengthening the life of Parliaments to seven years. An attempt to restrict the royal prerogative to create peers was defeated in 1719.

Notable Acts of the Parliament
Riot Act 1714
Queen Anne's Bounty Act 1714
Schism Act 1714
Security of the Sovereign Act 1714
Attainder of Duke of Ormonde Act 1714
Building of Churches, London and Westminster Act 1714
Septennial Act 1715
Papists Act 1715
Bank of England Act 1716
Queen Anne's Bounty Act 1716
Papists Act 1716
Transportation Act 1717
Indemnity Act 1717
Religious Worship Act 1718
Corporations Act 1718
Adulteration of Coffee Act 1718
Dependency of Ireland on Great Britain Act 1719
Royal Exchange and London Assurance Corporation Act 1719 (aka Bubble Act)

See also
1715 British general election
Townshend ministry 1714–1718
First Stanhope–Sunderland ministry 1717–1718
Second Stanhope–Sunderland ministry 1718-1721
Walpole–Townshend ministry 1721–1730
List of Acts of the Parliament of Great Britain, 1707–19
List of parliaments of Great Britain

Sources

External links
 

Parliament of Great Britain
1715 establishments in Great Britain